Mount Penanggungan is a small stratovolcano, immediately north of Arjuno-Welirang volcanic complex in East Java province, Java island, Indonesia. Mount Penanggungan is about 40 kilometers (24.8 mi) south of Surabaya, and can be seen from there on a clear day. Several Hindu-Buddhist sanctuaries, sacred places and monuments are on the mountain dating from AD 977–1511. Lava flows and pyroclastic deposits are around the volcano.

See also 

 List of volcanoes in Indonesia

References 

Penanggungan
Penanggungan